Bakary Bagayoko (born 7 October 1998) is a Guinean professional footballer who plays for Sporting Kansas City II in MLS Next Pro.

Career

College and amateur 
Bagayoko began his college career playing for Cumberland University. In 2021, Bagayoko was named to the All-Mid-South Conference First Team and was an NAIA All-American Honorable Mention. 

While at college, Bagayoko also appeared in the USL League Two with Lakeland Tropics, Reading United, and Ocean City Nor'easters.

Professional 
On 17 February 2022, Bagayoko signed a professional contract with Sporting Kansas City II in MLS Next Pro.

References

External links 
 Bakary Bagayoko MLS Next Pro profile
 Lipscomb profile
 NAIA profile

Living people
2000 births
Guinean footballers
Association football forwards
MLS Next Pro players
Sporting Kansas City II players
USL League Two players
Sportspeople from Conakry
Soccer players from New York City
Sportspeople from the Bronx
Cumberland Phoenix men's soccer players
Lipscomb Bisons men's soccer players
Lakeland Tropics players
Reading United A.C. players
Ocean City Nor'easters players
Guinean expatriate sportspeople in the United States
Expatriate soccer players in the United States
Guinean expatriate footballers